The 1959–60 British National League season was the sixth and final season of the British National League (1954–1960). Five teams participated in the league, and the Streatham Royals won the championship.

British National League

Regular season

Championship Play offs

Autumn Cup

Results

References

External links
 Nottingham Panthers history site

British
1959–60 in British ice hockey
1959 in English sport
1960 in English sport
1959 in Scottish sport
1960 in Scottish sport